Ty Mawr is a reservoir located between Llwyneinion and the Ruabon Moors in Wrexham County Borough, Wales. It is next to Cae Llwyd Reservoir.

Description 
The reservoir opened in 1908, and is operated today by Hafren Dyfrdwy on behalf of Severn Trent. It is part of a system of several small reservoirs including the Cae Llwyd Reservoir and Pen-y-Cae Reservoirs. The water of the lake is sourced from the drainage basin of the Pentre-bychan Brook and the Cae Llwyd Reservoir located at a higher elevation to the west of the reservoir. It holds the greatest continuous embankment length of any of the reservoirs operated by Severn Trent, and the embankment is made of a clay core.

The reservoir supplies Wrexham, Chester and surrounding areas, with it notably popular as a venue for anglers.

See also 
List of lakes of Wales

References 

Lakes of Wales
Bodies of water of Wrexham County Borough